Seán Cannon (born 29 November 1940 in Galway) is an Irish musician. Since 1982 he has been a guitarist for The Dubliners and their follow-up-band The Dublin Legends.

Early life
Seán Cannon was born in Galway, Ireland. He travelled around Europe at an early age, rambling in England, Germany, Switzerland and Spain. It was during these trips that Cannon learned to speak several languages. He moved to England and became a renowned solo artist, playing in almost every folk club in Britain.

Family
Cannon married Pamela Blick and has two sons, James and Robert Cannon. They later divorced. Seán Cannon lives in Coventry, United Kingdom.
His father, Jim Cannon, was born in Donegal, but moved to Galway City and married Kathleen Byrne, who came from Ballinue, Aughrim, Co Galway. Family still living in Ireland: cousin Martin Byrne, living in Banagher Co Offaly, Seamus Byrne Florencecourt Enniskillen Co Fermanagh, cousin Tom Forde living in Ballinasloe, Co Galway.

Career
By 1969, Cannon had joined an England-based folk group called "The Gaels". The Gaels consisted of three Irishmen and a Scotsman. They released an album. Cannon also released three solo albums in the 1970s.

Seán Cannon had known The Dubliners for years and, like Eamonn Campbell, joined them on stage on numerous occasions. When lead singer Luke Kelly became ill in 1980, he stepped in, and became a full-time Dubliner in 1983 when Kelly departed. Cannon is known for singing songs in the Irish language ("Peggy Lettermore", "Fáinne Gael an Lae", "Cill Chais") and humorous a cappella songs like "The Waterford Boys", "The Pool Song" or "The Sick Note".

When The Dubliners announced their retirement in 2012 after finishing their 50th Anniversary Tour, Seán Cannon decided to keep on touring with former band members Patsy Watchorn and Eamonn Campbell and Banjo player Gerry O'Connor under the name of "The Dublin Legends".

Cannon still manages to do some solo work in between the touring. He played gigs with Irish songwriter Pat Cooksey and more recently with his sons, James and Robert Cannon. They call themselves "The Cannons" and perform traditional Irish folk music as well as songs by Shane MacGowan, Bob Dylan, Johnny Cash and Hank Williams.

Discography

The Gaels 
 The Gaels (Midland Sound, 1969)

As a solo artist 
 Woes of War (Mount Recording Studio, 1974)
 The Roving Journeyman (Cottage Records, 1977)
 Erin the Green (Ogham Records, 1979)

The Dubliners 
 All albums from 1983 to 2012—see The Dubliners discography

The Dublin Legends 
 An Evening with The Dublin Legends: Live in Vienna (2014)

The Cannons 
 The Cannons (2011)
 Live in Salzgitter, Germany 2015 (double CD, 2016)

Trivia

Cannon is immortalised in the Christy Moore song "Lisdoonvarna". The line "Seán Cannon Doing Back Stage Cooking" is a direct reference to when Seán travelled to all the music festivals in the late 1970s with a converted caravan and sold curry.

References

Irish male singers
Irish guitarists
Irish male guitarists
Irish folk musicians
Musicians from County Galway
People from Galway (city)
1940 births
Living people
The Dubliners members